Eburiaca sinopia is a species of beetle in the family Cerambycidae, the only species in the genus Eburiaca.

References

Eburiini